Shalom Arush is an Israeli Breslov rabbi and founder of the Chut Shel Chessed Institutions. He spreads the teachings of Rebbe Nachman of Breslov among Sephardic and Ashkenazic baalei teshuva, as well as many non-Jews, around the world through his books and speaking appearances. Arush is a prominent defender of convicted rapist and fraudster Eliezer Berland.

Early life
Arush was one of nine children born to his parents in the town of Beni Mellal, Morocco. He learned in the local Jewish Alliance school and studied Hebrew in the evenings. His eldest brother married and immigrated to Israel before the rest of the family; Arush, his parents, and other siblings immigrated to Israel when he was 13.

The family settled in Petah Tikva, where his parents enrolled Arush in a state-religious school; he later attended a secular high school. In 1970 he joined the Israel Defense Forces as an airborne combat medic, taking part in many missions, including missions during the Yom Kippur War in 1973. During that time, five of his closest friends were killed in a helicopter crash while carrying out an army mission. This event was one of the catalysts for his personal teshuva.

Following his army service, Arush studied economics and accounting at Tel Aviv University.

Introduction to Breslov
Arush's quest for spirituality led him to Rabbi Eliezer Berland, who introduced him to Breslov practices such as hitbodedut and hosted him for Shabbat meals. Together with Berland, Arush learned with such Breslov giants as Rabbi Levi Yitzchok Bender and Rabbi Shmuel Shapira. Arush next enrolled at Yeshivat Dvar Yerushalayim as he took on more mitzvah observance. Eventually he cut his long hair and became a practicing Torah Jew. He was introduced to his wife, Miriam, on a shidduch, and the newlyweds moved to Moshav Chazon Yechezkel. Later he moved to Bnei Brak to join Berland's new yeshiva there, and when the yeshiva moved to Jerusalem, he and his family followed. Upon the directive of Berland, in 1985 Arush opened his own yeshiva with 15 students; a year later, he had 80 students and moved into his present quarters in the Musrara neighborhood of Jerusalem.

Chut Shel Chessed Institutions

The Chut Shel Chessed Institutions includes a yeshiva, a kolel for married men, a boarding school for teenage boys, and a Talmud Torah for younger boys. The organization specializes in nurturing youth at risk, and its alumni have gone on to become noted writers, actors, and musicians. Among Arush's celebrity students is Shuli Rand, star of the film Ushpizin.

In 1998 Arush opened a branch of Chut Shel Chesed in Ashdod, Israel, and appointed Rabbi Lazer Brody, another combat soldier-turned-baal teshuva, to head the rabbinic ordination program. In 2006 this branch merged with the Jerusalem yeshiva and Brody became the mashpia (spiritual guide) for Arush's students and the translator of Arush's books into English. On March 24, 2019, after being hospitalized for six days with pneumonia and a pericardial infection, Brody officially left Breslev Israel and the Chut Shel Chesed Institutions.

Works
Arush has authored many works which have been translated from Hebrew into English, Spanish,  French, Russian, German, 
Portuguese, and Yiddish. Brody claims that combined, they have sold more than a million copies.

 Garden of Peace: A Marital Guide for Men Only 
 Garden of Peace - Hebrew
 Garden of Emuna 
 Garden of Emuna - Russian
 Garden of Emuna - Spanish
 Garden of Emuna - Hebrew
 Garden of Emuna - German
 Garden of Emuna - French
 Garden of Emuna - Portuguese
 Women's Wisdom - English (Garden of Peace for women only)
 Women Wisdom - Russian (Garden of Peace for women only)
 Women's Wisdom - Hebrew (Garden of Peace for women only)
 In Forest Fields: A Unique Guide to Personal Prayer The Garden of Yearning: The Lost Princess Garden of Joy Garden of Gratitude Garden of Riches: A Guide to Financial Success Be-Gan HaOsher - Hebrew Shaarav Be-Toda - Garden of Gratitude''

References

External links
Breslev Israel (official site)
Teachings of Rebbe Nachman - Blog

Breslov rabbis
Israeli Hasidic rabbis
Sephardic Haredi rabbis in Israel
Moroccan emigrants to Israel
20th-century Moroccan Jews
Baalei teshuva
20th-century Israeli rabbis
People from Beni Mellal
1952 births
Living people
21st-century Israeli rabbis